Perry Matthews was a teacher and state legislator in Alabama. He represented Bullock County, Alabama in the Alabama House of Representatives from 1872 to 1876.

He was a native of Georgia born in 1849 or 1850.

He signed on to a Memorial by Republican members of the legislature describing election issues and partisan actions by Democrats. He is listed on a historical marker commemorating the service of African American state legislators in Alabama.

See also
African-American officeholders during and following the Reconstruction era

References

Year of birth uncertain
Year of death missing
1840s births
1850s births
People from Bullock County, Alabama
African-American politicians during the Reconstruction Era
Republican Party members of the Alabama House of Representatives